The 1996 United States House of Representatives election in Wyoming were held on November 5, 1996 to determine who would represent the state of Wyoming in the United States House of Representatives. Wyoming has one, at large district in the House, apportioned according to the 1990 United States Census, due to its low population. Representatives are elected for two-year terms.

Major candidates

Democratic 
Pete Maxfield

Republican 
Barbara Cubin, incumbent U.S. Congresswoman

Results

References 

1996 Wyoming elections
Wyoming
1996